Chestertown is a historic railway station built in 1902–03 for the Pennsylvania Railroad and located in Chestertown, Kent County, Maryland. It is a -story,  Queen Anne–style building.  It features a hip roof with a wide bracketed overhang that provided shelter for train passengers on all four sides.

It was listed on the National Register of Historic Places in 1982 as the Chestertown Railroad Station.

References

External links
, including photo from 1976, at Maryland Historical Trust

Former Pennsylvania Railroad stations
Transportation buildings and structures in Kent County, Maryland
Railway stations on the National Register of Historic Places in Maryland
Railway stations in the United States opened in 1903
National Register of Historic Places in Kent County, Maryland

Former railway stations in Maryland